Leclanché is a Swiss Lithium-ion cells company founded in 1909.

Through a licensed ceramic separator technology and focus on lithium–titanate technology, Leclanché manufactures large-format lithium-ion cells. At the end of the second quarter 2012, Leclanché started operations of its first production line with an installed annual capacity of up to 76 MWh in lithium titanate cells.

Leclanché was founded in 1909 in Yverdon-les-Bains in the Swiss canton of Vaud. The company is named after the Leclanché cell invented and patented by the French scientist Georges Leclanché in 1866. Through the integration of a spin-off from the German research organization Fraunhofer-Gesellschaft in 2006, the company pivoted from a traditional battery manufacturer to become a developer and manufacturer of lithium-ion cells. Leclanché employs 120 staff and is listed on the SIX Swiss Exchange (LECN). The company has its headquarters in Yverdon-les-Bains, Switzerland and production facilities in Willstätt in the state of Baden-Württemberg, Germany.

In 2017, the company announced a trial to install energy storage batteries at sites owned by Dutch charging station operator Fastned.

See also
 Georges Leclanché
 Zinc–carbon battery

References

Manufacturing companies established in 1909
Manufacturing companies of Switzerland
Swiss companies established in 1909
Battery manufacturers